Extra Extra may refer to:

 Newspaper extra, a special issue of a newspaper, advertised with the shout "Extra! Extra! Read all about it!", which became a catchphrase

Film and television
 Extra! Extra!, a 1922 American silent film
 Extra Challenge, formerly Extra, Extra 1999–2003, a Philippines TV news show
 Extra! Extra!, a 1988 Canadian TV drama featuring Jodie Resther
 Extra! Extra! Read All About It!, a 1993 Irish TV sitcom 
 "Extra, Extra", a 1982 episode of Three's Company
 "Extra!...Extra!", a segment of Extra (American TV program)

Music
 Extra Extra (album), by Tages, 1966
 Extra Extra (EP), by Be Your Own Pet, 2005
 "Extra! Extra!", a song by Irving Berlin, from the 1949 musical Miss Liberty

Other uses
 Extra extra, a species of minute sea snail
Extra Extra, Read All About It!: My Life as a Film and TV Extra, a 2012 autobiography of Harry Fielder

See also
Extra (disambiguation)
Extree! Extree!, a podcast created by Michael Swaim